Chandragupt Institute of Management Patna (CIMP) was established in 2008 as an autonomous institution under the Societies Act, with active support from the government of Bihar. It is an AICTE-approved and NBA accredited institution, offers a two-year full-time program in Post Graduate Diploma in Management.

Achievements

Awards 
 Received the TISS Award on 12 February 2013
 Received the International Arch of Europe (IAE) Award] on 28 April 2013, a vanity award
 Received the Majestic Five Continents Award for Quality & Excellence in Geneva, Switzerland on 18 November 2013, a vanity award
 Received the Socrates Award for "Best Institute/University" organized by Europe Business Assembly (EBA), The Club of the Rectors of Europe (CRE), Oxford, Great Britain, and EBA Conferences, UK in December 2013 (a vanity award)
 Received the European Award for Best Practices 2013 organized by the European Society for Quality Research (ESQR) in Vienna, Austria on 8 December 2013 (a vanity award)
 Received the Dr. J J Irani award  at Mumbai on 29 November 2012
 CIMP find the first place in MHRD database of AISHE survey
 Received the BID International Star for Leadership in Quality Award in BID Convention Paris 2015, a vanity award

Selection process 
Applicants are selected on the basis of CAT, XAT and CMAT  scores and are called to appear for Essay test, Group Discussion, and Personal Interview/Interaction. Academic profile, and work experience of candidates are also considered for short-listing. Upon aggregating their performance on these grounds, a merit list is prepared and students are selected. IIMs/XLRI have no role either in the selection process or in the conduct of the programme.

Reservation 
The institute follows reservation policy as prescribed by the Government of Bihar for educational institutions. The break-up of reservation policy is as follows:
 SC – 16%
 ST – 01%
 EBC – 18%
 BC – 12%,
 Women of BC – 3%

Amongst all the categories, 50% of the total seats are reserved for students who qualify as a Domicile of Bihar (permanent residents only) and 4% of the total seats for Person with Disability (PWD).

References

External links 
 Chandragupt Institute of Management Patna
 Photobook

Universities and colleges in Patna
Business schools in Bihar
Educational institutions established in 2008
2008 establishments in Bihar